Kum Kum Khanna is an Indian professor at the QIMR Berghofer Medical Research Institute, also known as Queensland Institute of Medical Research who has published  many peer reviewed articles in reputable journals such as in Nature Genetics, Cancer Cell, Nature, Oncogene, and many others. Her most cited article has received 1568 citations since its publication in 2001. she has made seminal discoveries in identifying  single-stranded DNA binding proteins, hSSB1 and hSSB2 involved in DNA repair; a novel protein, designated as Cep55, involved in regulation of final stage of cell cycle and have functionally characterized BRCA2 interacting protein, Centrobin.

References

Living people
20th-century births
Indian medical academics
Year of birth missing (living people)